The office of mayor of Rochester Hills, Michigan has been the city's chief executive since its elevation from Avon Township on November 20, 1984. The current, and most notable, mayor is Bryan Barnett who has been incumbent since 2006.

List of Mayors of Rochester Hills

References

Rochester Hills